City Primeval is a crime novel written by Elmore Leonard. A limited television series adaptation of the novel, Justified: City Primeval was ordered by FX with Timothy Olyphant to reprise his role as Raylan Givens.

Plot summary
The original novel takes place in Detroit and tells the story of a seriously crazed 'Oklahoma Wildman' Clement Mansell who knows how easy it is to get away with murder - thanks to some nifty courtroom moves by his beautiful, tough-as-nails lawyer Carolyn Wilder. But now the killer's senseless execution of a crooked Motown judge has inflamed the ire of homicide Detective Raymond Cruz, a good cop who believes in old-fashioned justice. When Mansell tries to extort money from the 'Albanian' Skender Lulgjaraj, Cruz isn't about to let Mansell slip through the legal system's gaping holes a second time. Even if that means maneuvering the psycho into a wild Midwest showdown that only one of them is going to be walking away from...

Characters in City Primeval
Clement Mansell – crazed 'Oklahoma Wildman'
Raymond Cruz – homicide detective
Sandy Stanton – Clement's girlfriend
Carolyn Wilder – Clement's lawyer
Skender Lulgjaraj – Albanian

References

External links
City Primeval at Elmore Leonard.com

1980 American novels
Novels by Elmore Leonard
Novels set in Detroit
Arbor House books